A Nereid is a sea nymph in Greek mythology.

Nereid or Nereids may also refer to:

Nereid (moon), the third-largest moon in the Neptune system
Nereid (worm), a polychaete worm
Nereids (organization), a fictional organization in the anime series Daphne in the Brilliant Blue
The Nereids, a lost tragedy by the Greek playwright Aeschylus assigned by modern scholars to the trilogy the Achilleis
Nereid Avenue (IRT White Plains Road Line), a station of the New York City Subway
Nereid Avenue (also known as East 238th Street; McLean Avenue in Yonkers, and West 5th Street in Mount Vernon), a major street in the Wakefield section of The Bronx, New York City
Nereid (Dungeons & Dragons), fey beings similar to nymphs and dryads

See also
French ship Néréide
HMS Nereide
Nereide (horse)
Neriad Horseshoe Bat, a species of bat
Nereida
Nereidi, a sculpture in Helsinki, Finland